Łukasz Jamróz (born 18 February 1990) is a Polish footballer who plays as a striker for Zio-Max Nowiny.

References

External links
 
 

1990 births
Living people
Polish footballers
Association football midfielders
Ekstraklasa players
Korona Kielce players
Arka Gdynia players
Sportspeople from Kielce
OKS Stomil Olsztyn players
Stal Rzeszów players